Gymnopilus praecox is a species of mushroom in the family Hymenogastraceae. It was given its current name by American mycologist Murrill in 1917.

See also
List of Gymnopilus species

References

External links
Gymnopilus praecox at Index Fungorum

praecox
Taxa named by Charles Horton Peck